Below is a '''list of current National Football League defensive coordinators.

AFC

NFC

See also
 List of current National Football League head coaches
 List of current National Football League offensive coordinators

National Football League defensive coordinators
National Football League lists